Events in the year 1989 in the People's Republic of China.

Incumbents 
 General Secretary of the Chinese Communist Party - Zhao Ziyang until June 24, Jiang Zemin
 President – Yang Shangkun
 Premier – Li Peng
 Vice President – Wang Zhen 
 Vice Premier – Yao Yilin 
 Congress Chairman - Wan Li
 Conference Chairman - Li Xiannian

Governors  
 Governor of Anhui Province – Li Rongling then Fu Xishou 
 Governor of Fujian Province – Wang Zhaoguo 
 Governor of Gansu Province – Jia Zhijie
 Governor of Guangdong Province – Ye Xuanping 
 Governor of Guizhou Province – Wang Zhaowen
 Governor of Hainan Province – Liu Jianfeng
 Governor of Hebei Province – Yue Qifeng 
 Governor of Heilongjiang Province – Hou Jie then Shao Qihui 
 Governor of Henan Province – Cheng Weigao 
 Governor of Hubei Province – Guo Zhenqian  
 Governor of Hunan Province – Xiong Qingquan then Chen Bangzhu
 Governor of Jiangsu Province – Gu Xiulian then Chen Huanyou  
 Governor of Jiangxi Province – Wu Guanzheng  
 Governor of Jilin Province – He Zhukang then Wang Zhongyu
 Governor of Liaoning Province – Li Changchun 
 Governor of Qinghai Province – Song Ruixiang then Jin Jipeng  
 Governor of Shaanxi Province – Hou Zongbin
 Governor of Shandong Province – Jiang Chunyun then Zhao Zhihao 
 Governor of Shanxi Province – Wang Senhao 
 Governor of Sichuan Province – Zhang Haoruo  
 Governor of Yunnan Province – Li Jiating 
 Governor of Zhejiang Province – Shen Zulun

Events

May
 May 13 – Mikhail Gorbachev visits China, the first Soviet leader to do so since the 1960s.
 May 19 – Tiananmen Square protests of 1989: Zhao Ziyang meets the demonstrators in Tiananmen Square.
 May 20 – Tiananmen Square protests of 1989: The Chinese government declares martial law in Beijing.
 May 30 – Tiananmen Square protests of 1989: The 10 m (33 ft) high Goddess of Democracy statue is unveiled in Tiananmen Square by student demonstrators.

June
 June 4 – Tiananmen Square massacre takes place in Beijing on the army's approach to the square, and the final stand-off in the square is covered live on television.
 June 24 - Jiang Zemin becomes General Secretary of the Chinese Communist Party.

Births

 January 18 - Li Huzhao, Paralympic athlete
 January 21 – Zhang Shuai, professional hockey player
 February 20 - Zhang Yangyang, mountain hopper
 March 18 - Lü Zhiwu, swimmer
 July 12 - Wang Xinnan, rower
 December 21 - Fang Yuting, archer

Deaths
 April 15 – Hu Yaobang, General Secretary of the Chinese Communist Party (born 1915)
 April 23 - Hu Die, Chinese actress (born 1907 or 1908)
 December 5 - Li Keran, a renowned contemporary Chinese painter (born 1907)

See also 
 1989 in Chinese film

References 

 
Years of the 20th century in China
China